North Caribou Lake is a lake in northwestern Kenora District, Ontario, Canada.

See also
List of lakes in Ontario
North Caribou Lake First Nation

References
 National Resources Canada

Further reading
 

Lakes of Kenora District